Ejective clicks may be:
Ejective-contour clicks, consonants that transition from a click to an ejective sound
Ejective oral non-contour glottalized clicks